William  Barry Scott (January 27, 1955  September 10, 2020) was an American actor and voice-over artist.

Early life
Scott was born in Nashville, Tennessee. He attended Tennessee State University, and founded the American Negro Playwright Theatre.

Career
Scott had an extensive career on stage, and penned several stage-plays, including Ain't Got Long to Stay Here, a tribute to Martin Luther King Jr. He also appeared in several feature films, notably Ernest Goes to Jail (1990) and its sequel Ernest Scared Stupid (1991). 

In addition, he was known for lending his voice to many broadcast commercials and public-service announcements, and was a voice-over artist for the National Basketball Association (NBA) and Total Nonstop Action Wrestling (TNA, now Impact Wrestling), where he was referred to as "the voice of TNA Wrestling". 

In 1993, he was named Nashvillian of the Year for his work on stage.

In 2008, Scott narrated the words of Abraham Lincoln in two large-scale orchestral works: A Lincoln Address, by American composer Vincent Persichetti, and A Lincoln Portrait, by American composer Aaron Copland; both pieces were recorded with the Nashville Symphony under the baton of conductor Leonard Slatkin.

Death
Scott died in Nashville on September 10, 2020, at the age of 65. The cause of death was stage IV colon cancer.

Filmography

Film

Television

References

External links
 

1955 births
2020 deaths
20th-century American male actors
People from Nashville, Tennessee